Sudhakara Dvivedi (1855–1910) was an Indian scholar in Sanskrit and mathematics.

Biography
Sudhakara Dvivedi was born in 1855 in Khajuri, a village near Varanasi. In childhood he studied mathematics under Pandit Devakrsna.

In 1883 he was appointed a librarian in the Government Sanskrit College, Varanasi where in 1898 
he was appointed the teacher of mathematics and astrology after Bapudeva Sastri retired in 1889.

He was the head of mathematics department in Queen's college Benaras from where he retired in 1905 and mathematician Ganesh Prasad became the new head of department. Dvivedi wrote a number of translations, commentaries and treatises, including one on algebra which included topics such as Pellian equations, squares, and Diophantine equations.

Works in Sanskrit
Chalan Kalan
Deergha Vritta Lakshan ("Characteristics of Ellipse")
Goleeya Rekha Ganit ("Sphere Line Mathematics")
Samikaran Meemansa ("Analysis of Equations")
Yajusha Jyauti-sham and Archa Jyauti-sham
Ganakatarangini (1892)
  Euclid's Elements 6th, 11th and 12th parts
Lilavati (1879)
Bijaganita (1889)
Pañcasiddhāntikā of Varāhamihira (1889): Co-edited with George Thibaut
Surya Siddhanta
Brahmagupta’s Brāhmasphuṭasiddhānta, 1902,
Aryabhata II's Maha-Siddhanta (1910)

Works in Hindi
Differential Calculus (1886)
Integral Calculus (1895)
Theory of equations (1897)
A History of Hindu mathematics I (1910)

References

External links
Yajusha Jyauti-sham

19th-century Indian mathematicians
Scholars from Varanasi
1855 births
1910 deaths
Hindu astronomy
Sanskrit scholars from Uttar Pradesh
Historians of mathematics
20th-century Indian mathematicians